Johann Ernest IV, Duke of Saxe-Coburg-Saalfeld (22 August 1658 in Gotha – 17 February 1729 in Saalfeld) was a reigning duke of Saxe-Coburg-Saalfeld.

Life
He was the tenth but seventh surviving son of Ernest I, Duke of Saxe-Gotha and Elisabeth Sophie of Saxe-Altenburg.

After the death of his father in 1675, Johann Ernest initially governed the duchy of Saxe-Gotha-Altenburg, jointly with his six older brothers, as set out in their father's will. However, in 1680, the brothers concluded a treaty dividing the paternal lands and Johann Ernest became duke of Saxe-Saalfeld, with the towns of Gräfenthal, Probstzella and Pössneck. As he was the youngest, he kept the smallest portion of the lands.

Johann Ernest and his brother Ernest soon found themselves financially overstretched as a result of the partition (the income of their eldest brother, Frederick, far exceeded the income of Johann Ernest), and they both made a protest. Over the following years, the controversy continued and increased, as their older brothers Albert of Saxe-Coburg, Henry of Saxe-Römhild and Christian of Saxe-Eisenberg died without male heirs. During these years, Johann Ernest took possession of Coburg (in 1699), Römhild and 5/12 of Themar (in 1714).

The "Coburg-Eisenberg-Römhilder Erbstreit" was finally resolved (after repeated intervention and arbitration by the emperor) in 1735, six years after the death of Johann Ernest. His descendants retained Coburg. The decision was generally accepted, most importantly by the descendants of his older brother Bernhard, who also had a claim to Coburg.

Issue
In Merseburg on 18 February 1680, Johann Ernst married firstly Sophie Hedwig of Saxe-Merseburg, a daughter of Christian I, Duke of Saxe-Merseburg. They had five children:
 Christiane Sophie (b. Saalfeld, 14 June 1681 – d. Saalfeld, 3 June 1697).
 Stillborn daughter (Saalfeld, 6 May 1682).
 Christian Ernst, Duke of Saxe-Coburg-Saalfeld (b. Saalfeld, 18 August 1683 – d. Saalfeld, 4 September 1745).
 Charlotte Wilhelmine (b. Saalfeld, 4 May 1685 – d. Hanau, 5 April 1767), married on 26 December 1705 to Philip Reinhard, Count of Hanau-Münzenberg.
 Stillborn son (Saalfeld, 2 August 1686).

In Maastricht on 2 December 1690 Johann Ernst married secondly Charlotte Johanna of Waldeck-Wildungen (b. Arolsen, 13 December 1664, d. Hildburghausen, 1 February 1699). They had eight children:
 Wilhelm Frederick (b. Arolsen, 16 August 1691 – d. Saalfeld, 28 July 1720).
 Karl Ernst (b. Saalfeld, 12 September 1692 – d. Cremona, 30 December 1720).
 Sophia Wilhelmina (b. Saalfeld, 9 August 1693 – d. Rudolstadt, 4 December 1727), married on 8 February 1720 to Frederick Anton, Prince of Schwarzburg-Rudolstadt.
 Henriette Albertine (b. Saalfeld, 8 July 1694 – d. Saalfeld, 1 April 1695).
 Louise Emilie (b. Saalfeld, 24 August 1695 – d. Coburg, 21 August 1713).
 Charlotte (b. Saalfeld, 30 October 1696 – d. Saalfeld, 2 November 1696).
 Francis Josias, Duke of Saxe-Coburg-Saalfeld (b. Saalfeld, 25 September 1697 – d. Rodach, 16 September 1764).
 Henriette Albertine (b. Saalfeld, 20 November 1698 – d. Coburg, 5 February 1728).

Ancestry

References
 Carl-Christian Dressel: Die Entwicklung von Verfassung und Verwaltung in Sachsen-Coburg 1800 - 1826 im Vergleich. Duncker & Humblot Berlin 2007, .
 Ernst Wülcker: Johann Ernst (Herzog von Sachsen-Coburg-Saalfeld). In: Allgemeine Deutsche Biographie  (ADB). vol XIV. Duncker & Humblot, Leipzig 1881, pp. 372–374.
 Jahrbuch fur Europäische Geschichte 2007, vol. VIII, Oldenbourg Wissenschaftsverlag, 2007, p. 104. (Online)
 Johann Samuel Ersch, Allgemeine Encyclopädie der Wissenschaften und Künste, section 21, Leipzig, 1842, p. 254. (Online)

External links
 WW-Person: A data base of the higher nobility in Europe, by Herbert Stoyan

1658 births
1729 deaths
People from Gotha (town)
Dukes of Saxe-Coburg-Saalfeld
Dukes of Saxe-Saalfeld
Dukes of Saxe-Coburg